This is chronological list of films produced in Israel split by decade. There may be an overlap between Israeli and foreign films which are sometimes co-produced; nevertheless, the lists should attempt to document mainly the Israeli produced films or the films which are strongly associated with the Israeli culture.

For a detailed alphabetical list of Israeli films currently covered on Wikipedia see :Category:Israeli films.

20th century 
 List of Israeli films before 1960
 List of Israeli films of the 1960s
 List of Israeli films of the 1970s
 List of Israeli films of the 1980s
 List of Israeli films of the 1990s

21st century 
 List of Israeli films of the 2000s
 List of Israeli films of the 2010s
 List of Israeli films of the 2020s

External links
 Israeli film at the Internet Movie Database
 Israeli film database at the Israel Film Center